Kolak (or kolek) is an Indonesian dessert based on palm sugar or coconut sugar, coconut milk, and pandanus leaf (P. amaryllifolius). A variation in which banana is added, is called kolak pisang or banana kolak. Other variations may add ingredients such as pumpkins, sweet potatoes, jackfruit, plantains, cassava, rice balls, and tapioca pearls. It is usually served warm or at room temperature, but some prefer it cold.

In Indonesia, kolak is a popular iftar dish during the holy month of Ramadan and is also a popular street food.

Gallery

See also

Binignit, a similar dish from the Philippines

External links

Kolak - Banana, Sweet Potatoes, and Tapioca in Coconut Milk - description and recipe.
Kolak - Banana Compote in Coconut Milk - Recipe and step-by-step photos

Indonesian snack foods
Indonesian desserts
Foods containing coconut
Street food in Indonesia